The superciliaried hemispingus (Thlypopsis superciliaris) is a species of bird in the family Thraupidae.

It is found in Bolivia, Colombia, Ecuador, Peru, and Venezuela. Its natural habitats are subtropical or tropical moist montane forests and degraded former forest.

References

superciliaried hemispingus
Birds of the Northern Andes
superciliaried hemispingus
Taxonomy articles created by Polbot